The 2012–13 UEFA Europa League was the 42nd season of Europe's secondary club football tournament organised by UEFA, and the 4th season since it was renamed from the UEFA Cup to the UEFA Europa League.

The final was played at the Amsterdam Arena in Amsterdam, Netherlands. It was contested on 15 May 2013 between Portuguese club Benfica and English club Chelsea, who entered the competition at the Round of 32 after they finished in third place in the group stage of the 2012–13 Champions League. Chelsea won the final 2–1 for their first Europa League title, making them the fourth club – after Juventus, Ajax and Bayern Munich – and the first English club to have won all three major European trophies (UEFA Champions League, Europa League, and the Cup Winners' Cup).

For the 2012–13 edition, the following changes were made from the 2011–12 edition:
The cup winners of the six top-ranked associations had direct access to the UEFA Europa League group stage. This allocation of slots has a direct impact on the qualification path, and adaptations were made to the access list in order to accommodate these changes.
Matchdays 5 and 6 were no longer held on exclusive weeks, but instead were played on the same weeks as Matchdays 5 and 6 of the UEFA Champions League.

Atlético Madrid were the defending champions, but were eliminated by Rubin Kazan in the Round of 32.

Association team allocation
A total of 193 teams from 53 UEFA member associations participate in the 2012–13 UEFA Europa League. The association ranking based on the UEFA country coefficients is used to determine the number of participating teams for each association:
Associations 1–6 each have three teams qualify
Associations 7–9 each have four teams qualify
Associations 10–51 (except Liechtenstein) each have three teams qualify
Associations 52–53 each have two teams qualify
Liechtenstein has one team qualify (as it organises only a domestic cup and no domestic league)
The top three associations of the 2011–12 UEFA Respect Fair Play ranking each gain an additional berth
Moreover, 32 teams eliminated from the 2012–13 UEFA Champions League are transferred to the Europa League (this is one fewer than usual as Tottenham Hotspur did not participate in the UEFA Champions League non-champions qualifying path due to Chelsea winning the 2011–12 UEFA Champions League)
The winners of the 2011–12 UEFA Europa League are given an additional entry as title holders if they do not qualify for the 2012–13 UEFA Champions League or Europa League through their domestic performance. However, this additional entry is not necessary for this season since the title holders qualified for European competitions through their domestic performance.

Association ranking
For the 2012–13 UEFA Europa League, the associations are allocated places according to their 2011 UEFA country coefficients, which takes into account their performance in European competitions from 2006–07 to 2010–11.

Notes
FP: Additional berth via Fair Play ranking (Norway, Finland, Netherlands)
UCL: Additional teams transferred from the Champions League

Distribution
Due to the following reasons, changes to the default allocation system had to be made:
The title holders, Atlético Madrid, were guaranteed a place in the Europa League group stage, since they did not qualify for the Champions League. However, they also qualified for the group stage through their domestic performance, as they finished fifth in the 2011–12 La Liga and Champions League-qualified Barcelona won the 2011–12 Copa del Rey. As a result, this spot in the group stage was vacated.
Only 14 losers (instead of the default 15) from the 2012–13 UEFA Champions League third qualifying round entered the Europa League play-off round.
The following changes to the default allocation system were made to compensate for these vacated spots:
The domestic cup winners of association 7 (Russia) were promoted from the play-off round to the group stage.
The domestic cup winners of associations 16 and 17 (Switzerland and Israel) were promoted from the third qualifying round to the play-off round.
The domestic cup winners of associations 19 and 20 (Austria and Cyprus) were promoted from the second qualifying round to the third qualifying round.
The domestic cup winners of associations 33, 34, 35 and 36 (Moldova, Lithuania, Latvia and Georgia) were promoted from the first qualifying round to the second qualifying round.

Redistribution rules
A Europa League place is vacated when a team qualifies for both the Champions League and the Europa League, or qualifies for the Europa League by more than one method. When a place is vacated, it is redistributed within the national association by the following rules:
When the domestic cup winners (considered as the "highest-placed" qualifier within the national association with the latest starting round) also qualify for the Champions League, their Europa League place is vacated. As a result, either of the following teams qualify for the Europa League:
The domestic cup runners-up, provided they have not yet qualified for European competitions, qualify for the Europa League as the "lowest-placed" qualifier (with the earliest starting round), with the other Europa League qualifiers moved up one "place".
Otherwise, the highest-placed team in the league which have not yet qualified for European competitions qualify for the Europa League, with the Europa League qualifiers which finish above them in the league moved up one "place".
When the domestic cup winners also qualify for the Europa League through league position, their place through the league position is vacated. As a result, the highest-placed team in the league which have not yet qualified for European competitions qualify for the Europa League, with the Europa League qualifiers which finish above them in the league moved up one "place" if possible.
For associations where a Europa League place is reserved for the League Cup winners, they always qualify for the Europa League as the "lowest-placed" qualifier (or as the second "lowest-placed" qualifier in cases where the cup runners-up qualify as stated above). If the League Cup winners have already qualified for European competitions through other methods, this reserved Europa League place is taken by the highest-placed league team in the league which have not yet qualified for European competitions.
A Fair Play place is taken by the highest-ranked team in the domestic Fair Play table which have not yet qualified for European competitions.

Teams
The labels in the parentheses show how each team qualified for the place of its starting round:
TH: Title holders
CW: Cup winners
CR: Cup runners-up
LC: League Cup winners
2nd, 3rd, 4th, 5th, 6th, etc.: League position
CL4R: League placed 4th but entered Europa League due to Champions League 4 teams per association rule
P-W: End-of-season European competition play-offs winners
FP: Fair Play
UCL: Transferred from the Champions League
GS: Third-placed teams from the group stage
PO: Losers from the play-off round
Q3: Losers from the third qualifying round

Notes

Round and draw dates
All draws are held at UEFA headquarters in Nyon, Switzerland unless stated otherwise.

Matches in the qualifying, play-off, and knockout rounds may also be played on Tuesdays or Wednesdays instead of the regular Thursdays due to scheduling conflicts.

Qualifying rounds

In the qualifying rounds and the play-off round, teams were divided into seeded and unseeded teams based on their 2012 UEFA club coefficients, and then drawn into two-legged home-and-away ties. Teams from the same association could not be drawn against each other.

First qualifying round
The draws for the first and second qualifying rounds were held on 25 June 2012. The first legs were played on 3 and 5 July, and the second legs were played on 10 and 12 July 2012.

Notes
Note 1: Order of legs reversed after original draw.

Second qualifying round
The first legs were played on 19 July, and the second legs were played on 26 July 2012.

Notes
Note 2: Order of legs reversed after original draw.

Third qualifying round
The draw for the third qualifying rounds was held on 20 July 2012. The first legs were played on 2 August, and the second legs were played on 9 August 2012.

Notes
Note 3: UEFA awarded Mura 05 a 3–0 win due to Arsenal Kyiv fielding suspended player Éric Matoukou in the first leg. The original match had ended in a 3–0 win for Arsenal Kyiv.
Note 4: Order of legs reversed after original draw.
Note 5: The match was abandoned in the 82nd minute due to crowd disturbance. Dila Gori was leading 3–0. That result was confirmed standing by UEFA.

Play-off round

The draw for the play-off round was held on 10 August 2012. The first legs were played on 22 and 23 August, and the second legs were played on 28 and 30 August 2012.

Notes
Note 6: Order of legs reversed after original draw.

Group stage

The draw for the group stage was held in Monaco on 31 August 2012. The 48 teams were allocated into four pots based on their 2012 UEFA club coefficients, with the title holders, Atlético Madrid, being placed in Pot 1 automatically. They were drawn into twelve groups of four, with the restriction that teams from the same association could not be drawn against each other.

In each group, teams played against each other home-and-away in a round-robin format. The matchdays were 20 September, 4 October, 25 October, 8 November, 22 November, and 6 December 2012. The group winners and runners-up advanced to the round of 32, where they were joined by the eight third-placed teams from the 2012–13 UEFA Champions League group stage.

A total of 25 national associations were represented in the group stage. This was the first time a team from Azerbaijan qualified for the group stage of a UEFA competition. AEL, Anzhi, Kiryat Shmona, Levante, Marítimo, Neftçi and Videoton all appeared in the group stage of a UEFA competition for the first time.

See here for tiebreakers if two or more teams are equal on points.

Group A

Group B

Group C

Group D

Group E

Group F

Group G

Group H

Group I

Group J

Group K

Group L

Knockout phase

In the knockout phase, teams played against each other over two legs on a home-and-away basis, except for the one-match final. The mechanism of the draws for each round is as follows:
In the draw for the round of 32, the twelve group winners and the four third-placed teams from the Champions League group stage with the better group records were seeded, and the twelve group runners-up and the other four third-placed teams from the Champions League group stage were unseeded. The seeded teams were drawn against the unseeded teams, with the seeded teams hosting the second leg. Teams from the same group or the same association could not be drawn against each other.
In the draws for the round of 16 onwards, there were no seedings, and teams from the same group or the same association could be drawn against each other.

Bracket

Round of 32
The draws for the round of 32 and round of 16 were held on 20 December 2012. The first legs were played on 14 February, and the second legs were played on 21 February 2013.

Round of 16
The first legs were played on 7 March, and the second legs were played on 14 March 2013.

Quarter-finals
The draw for the quarter-finals was held on 15 March 2013. The first legs were played on 4 April, and the second legs were played on 11 April 2013.

Semi-finals
The draw for the semi-finals and final (to determine the "home" team for administrative purposes) was held on 12 April 2013. The first legs were played on 25 April, and the second legs were played on 2 May 2013.

Final

The final was played on 15 May 2013 at the Amsterdam Arena in Amsterdam, Netherlands.

Statistics
Statistics exclude qualifying rounds and play-off round.

Top goalscorers

Top assists

See also
2013 UEFA Super Cup

References

External links

2012–13 UEFA Europa League, UEFA.com

 
2
2012-13